Jaime Zóbel de Ayala y Pfitz  (born 18 July 1934), also known as Jaime Zóbel, is a Filipino businessman who served as the chairman of the Ayala Corporation from 1984 to 2006 and as its president from 1984 to 1994. Presently, he holds the honorary title as "Chairman Emeritus". 

Zóbel served as the Ambassador of the Republic of the Philippines to the United Kingdom from 1970 to 1975. He is also known as a noted art photographer being the first Filipino photographer to be given a Licentiate by the Royal Photographic Society of the United Kingdom.

Early life and family
Zóbel was born on 18 July 1934 to Alfonso Zóbel de Ayala (1904–1967) and Carmen Pfitz y Herrero (1909–1999). His siblings are Maria Victoria ("Vicky") and Alfonso Jr. ("Alfonsito"). He is a grandson of Enrique Zóbel de Ayala and Consuelo de Ayala.

He is married to Beatriz Miranda. Together they have two sons (Jaime Augusto and Fernando) and five daughters (Beatriz Susana ("Bea Jr."), Patricia, Cristina, Monica, and Sofia).

Education
After early education in the Philippines, Zóbel attended Harvard University, where he graduated in 1957 with a bachelor's degree in architectural sciences. He attended the six-week Advanced Management Program in the Far East, conducted by faculty from the Harvard Graduate School of Business Administration in Baguio, the Philippines in 1963.

Career

Ayala Corporation
Zóbel joined Ayala y Compañía in 1958 as executive assistant upon the invitation of his father. His father placed him under the wing of his cousin Enrique and uncle Col. Joseph McMicking. As an executive assistant in the company, he took down notes during management meetings and gradually learned the ropes of the family business. He was later transferred to the training section of the insurance companies of the Ayala group. In 1975, he became president of Filipinas Life Assurance Company (now, BPI-Philam Life Assurance Corporation). 

In 1984, he succeeded Enrique, as chairman and president of Ayala Corporation. Zóbel successfully steered Ayala through the tense, final years of the Marcos dictatorship. In 1988, the real estate division was spun off as Ayala Land, Inc. Ayala Corporation also ventured into new businesses, like automotive (Ayala Automotive Holdings Corporation).

Zóbel stepped down as president of Ayala Corporation in 1994 and was succeeded by his son, Jaime Augusto. He continued as chairman until his retirement in 2006 and became the chairman emeritus of Ayala Corporation.

Photography
Zóbel joined the Camera Club of the Philippines in the mid-1970s and began taking photography more seriously. He is the first Filipino amateur photographer to be confirmed “Licentiate” by the Royal Photographic Society of the United Kingdom, and has received similar commendations from the French and Spanish governments for his contributions to art and culture. He exhibits regularly in the Philippines and abroad, and has produced several critically acclaimed books. He continues to break new ground in art photography with explorations in various art media.

Diplomat
Between 1970 and 1975, Zóbel was appointed as the Philippine Ambassador to the Court of St. James's in London, representing the United Kingdom and ambassador of Scandinavian countries.

Honors and awards
 1968, Comendador al Mérito Civil, Spain
 1980, Chevalier de l’Ordre des Arts et des Lettres, France
 1985, Doctor of Business Management (honoris causa) De La Salle University, Manila
 1986, Senator Award, highest honor bestowed by the JCI Philippines
 1987, “Management Man of the Year”, Management Association of the Philippines
 1991, Doctor of  Laws (honoris causa), University of the Philippines Diliman
 2004, FIRST Responsible Capitalism Award Winner
 2008, Hero of Philanthropy, Forbes magazine, special issue Asia magazine initiated this recognition, including four Filipinos: Jaime Zobel de Ayala, John Gokongwei, Ramon del Rosario Jr., and Oscar Lopez. The list recognizes four philanthropists from each of 13 selected countries and territories in Asia
 2009, Philippine Legion of Honor, Rank of Grand Commander, Armed Forces of the Philippines
 2018, Order of the Rising Sun, Second Class, Gold and Silver Star, Japan

Notability
In 2007, Zóbel was ranked as tied with Henry Sy as the richest person in the Philippines, with a net worth of $2.6 billion, according to Forbes magazine.
In 2008, Zóbel and his family were ranked 3rd in Forbes magazine's 2008 list of 40 wealthiest Filipinos, due to a 46% drop in their conglomerate Ayala Corp. shares, which were worth $800 million.

See also
 Zóbel de Ayala family

References

Further reading
 Jaime Zobel de Ayala & family, The World's Richest People, Forbes.com
  Ayala at 175 Magazine
  Ayala 2009 Annual Report

External links
 Jaime Zobel (official website)

1934 births
Filipino people of German descent
Filipino people of Basque descent
Filipino people of Spanish descent
Harvard University alumni
20th-century Filipino businesspeople
Jaime
Filipino billionaires
Filipino photographers
Filipino businesspeople in real estate
Filipino bankers
Businesspeople in retailing
Businesspeople in telecommunications
Living people
People from Manila
Filipino diplomats
Ambassadors of the Philippines to the United Kingdom
Chevaliers of the Ordre des Arts et des Lettres
21st-century Filipino businesspeople